Hard Hat Area is the eighth studio album by guitarist Allan Holdsworth, released in 1993 through Polydor Records (Japan), JMS–Cream Records (Europe) and Fred Bloggs Music (United Kingdom), and in 1994 through Restless Records (United States); a remastered edition with expanded liner notes was reissued on 15 May 2012 through MoonJune Records.

Holdsworth frequently cited the album as one of his favourites. "Tullio" is a reference to cycling component innovator and company founder Tullio Campagnolo.

Critical reception

Hard Hat Area has received mostly positive reviews. John Kelman at All About Jazz called it one of Holdsworth's better solo recordings, naming "Ruhkukah" and "Low Levels, High Stakes" as highlights. He also praised the line-up of keyboardist Steve Hunt, drummer Gary Husband and bassist Skúli Sverrisson, but noted that it was sometimes difficult to distinguish between Hunt's playing and Holdsworth's SynthAxe.

Glenn Astarita at AllMusic called the album one of Holdsworth's "better solo excursions", and "a must-have" for fans of his work. Like Kelman, he named "Ruhkukah" and "Low Levels, High Stakes" as highlights.

Track listing

Personnel
Allan Holdsworth – guitar, SynthAxe, engineering, mixing, production
Steve Hunt – keyboard
Gary Husband – drums
Skúli Sverrisson – bass

Technical
Rejean de Grand'Maison – engineering
Gordon Davis – mixing
Bernie Grundman – mastering
Chris Bellman – remastering (reissue)

References

External links
Hard Hat Area at therealallanholdsworth.com (archived)
Allan Holdsworth "Hard Hat Area" at Guitar Nine

Allan Holdsworth albums
1993 albums
Polydor Records albums
Restless Records albums